Oranjemund is a constituency in the ǁKaras Region of Namibia. It covers an area of 4,623.138 km2 and had a population of 9,837 in 2011, up from 7,789 in 2001. The main towns are the district capital Oranjemund and the mining town of Rosh Pinah, the constituency also contains the Sendelingsdrift border post.  the constituency had 7,894 registered voters.

Economic activities concentrate on mining and tourism, the  unemployment rate is 48%.

Politics
In the 2010 regional elections, SWAPO's Eliphas Iita won the constituency with 1,928 votes. His only challenger was Ignatius Murorua of the Rally for Democracy and Progress (RDP), who received 257 votes. Also in the 2015 regional elections the candidate of SWAPO won and Lasarus Angula Nangolo was elected with 2,607 votes against his challenger Simon Haulofu of RDP who received 201 votes. Nangolo was re-elected in the 2020 regional election after obtaining 1,730 votes. Ruben Andreas of the Independent Patriots for Change (IPC, an opposition party formed in August 2020) came second with 980 votes, and  Emerentia Riekert of the Landless People's Movement (LPM, a new party registered in 2018) came third with 628 votes.

References

Constituencies of ǁKaras Region
States and territories established in 1992
1992 establishments in Namibia